Ptinus tumidus is a species of spider beetle in the family Ptinidae. It is found in North America.

References

Further reading

 
 
 

Ptinus
Beetles described in 1905